Dianyuea turbinata is a species of shrub endemic to the Tongbiguan Nature Preserve in Yunnan province of China. Originally described in the genus Flacourtia (F. turbinata) based on limited material (no male individuals), this unusual species is now recognized as the sole member of the genus Dianyuea and is the only other member of subfamily Scyphostegioideae of Salicaceae. In addition to phylogenetic analyses of DNA data, the species's basal placentation, connate stamen filaments, and seeds with arilloid appendages indicate that this species is related to Scyphostegia, a monotypic genus which is now placed in a broadly circumscribed Salicaceae.

The genus is named after Dian-Yue (Chinese: 滇越), an ancient kingdom on the Southern Silk Road, where the genus/species is found.

References

Salicaceae
Monotypic Malpighiales genera
Salicaceae genera